Saint Thomas Aquinas Regional Catholic High School is a private, Roman Catholic high school in unincorporated Tangipahoa Parish, Louisiana, near Hammond.  It is located in the Roman Catholic Diocese of Baton Rouge.

History
The school began operations in August 1986 with 35 students.

Students
The school offers Grades 9, 10, 11 & 12. In the 2015–2016 school year, the student body was distributed as shown:

This school has about 320 students. Of these, 276 are categorized as "White, non-Hispanic." The school is about 86% White.

Athletics
Saint Thomas Aquinas Regional Catholic athletics competes in the LHSAA.

Notable People
Modestas Bukauskas known as The Baltic Gladiator (born February 10, 1994) is a Lithuanian-British mixed martial artist who competes in the Light Heavyweight division of the Ultimate Fighting Championship (Class of 2012).
Cameron Dantzler NFL Player, played cornerback for the Minnesota Vikings

Notes and references

External links
 School Website

Hammond, Louisiana
Catholic secondary schools in Louisiana
Schools in Tangipahoa Parish, Louisiana